John Bone may refer to:

John Bone (bishop) (1930–2014), British religious leader
John T. Bone (born 1947), British-born actor
John Gavin Bone (born 1914), Scottish Olympic cyclist
John Bone (footballer) (1930–2002), English footballer